Chydaeus is a genus of beetles in the family Carabidae. Members of this genus are distributed mainly over mountainous regions of southeastern Asia, from the Himalayas and China to the Sunda Islands; however, three species are known from New Guinea and one from Australia.

Species
The genus contains the following species:

 Chydaeus abramovi Kataev & Fedorenko, 2013 – Vietnam
 Chydaeus acutangulus Kataev & Schmidt, 2006
 Chydaeus acutangulus acutangulus
 Chydaeus acutangulus shiva Kataev & Schmidt, 2006
 Chydaeus andrewesi Schauberger, 1932
 Chydaeus andrewesi andrewesi
 Chydaeus andrewesi szetschuanus Schauberger, 1932 – southeastern China
 Chydaeus asetosus Kataev & Kavanaugh, 2012 – Yunnan, China
 Chydaeus bakeri Andrewes, 1926
 Chydaeus baoshanensis Kataev & Liang, 2012 – Yunnan, China
 Chydaeus bedeli (Tschitscherine, 1897)
 Chydaeus bedeli bedeli
 Chydaeus bedeli difficilis Kataev & Schmidt, 2001
 Chydaeus bedeli interjectus Kataev & Schmidt, 2001
 Chydaeus bedeli longipennis Kataev & Schmidt, 2001
 Chydaeus bedeli vietnamensis Kataev & Schmidt, 2001 – Vietnam
 Chydaeus belousovi Kataev, Wrase & Schmidt, 2014 – Yunnan, China
 Chydaeus bhutanensis Kataev & J.Schmidt, 2001
 Chydaeus chujoi Habu, 1975
 Chydaeus chuliensis Kataev, Wrase & Schmidt, 2014 – Nepal
 Chydaeus constrictus (Bates, 1883)
 Chydaeus convexiusculus Kataev & Schmidt, 2006
 Chydaeus convexus Ito, 2002
 Chydaeus dalatensis Kataev & Fedorenko, 2013 – Vietnam
 Chydaeus darlingtoni Baehr, 2007
 Chydaeus dissimilis Kataev, Wrase & Schmidt, 2014 – Taiwan
 Chydaeus doiinthanonensis Ito, 1992
 Chydaeus eremita Kataev & Schmidt, 2006
 Chydaeus fugongensis Kataev & Kavanaugh, 2012 – Yunnan, China
 Chydaeus ganeshensis Kataev, Wrase & Schmidt, 2014 – Nepal
 Chydaeus gestroi Andrewes, 1929
 Chydaeus gutangensis Kataev & Liang, 2012 – Tibet, China
 Chydaeus hanmiensis Kataev & Liang, 2012 – Tibet, China
 Chydaeus harpaloides Kataev & Schmidt, 2006
 Chydaeus hinnus Darlington, 1971
 Chydaeus irvinei (Andrewes, 1930)
 Chydaeus jedlickai Schauberger, 1932
 Chydaeus kabaki Kataev, Wrase & Schmidt, 2014 – Sichuan, China
 Chydaeus kasaharai Ito, 2002
 Chydaeus kirishimanus Habu, 1973 – Japan
 Chydaeus kumei Ito, 1992
 Chydaeus luxiensis Kataev, Wrase & Schmidt, 2014 – Yunnan, China
 Chydaeus majusculus Kataev & Fedorenko, 2013 – Vietnam
 Chydaeus malaisei Kataev & Schmidt, 2006
 Chydaeus manasluensis Kataev & Schmidt, 2001
 Chydaeus minimus Kataev & Schmidt, 2001
 Chydaeus miwai Jedlicka, 1946
 Chydaeus nepalensis Kataev & Schmidt, 2006
 Chydaeus nepalensis nepalensis – Nepal
 Chydaeus nepalensis punctulatus Kataev & Schmidt, 2006
 Chydaeus nepalensis schawalleri Kataev & Schmidt, 2006
 Chydaeus obscurus Chaudoir, 1854  
 Chydaeus obtusicollis Schauberger, 1932
 Chydaeus ovalipennis Kataev & Schmidt, 2001
 Chydaeus papua Darlington, 1968
 Chydaeus putaoensis Kataev, Wrase & Schmidt, 2014 – Myanmar
 Chydaeus queenslandicus Baehr, 2004 – Queensland, Australia
 Chydaeus rufipes Jedlicka, 1940
 Chydaeus salvazae Schauberger, 1934  
 Chydaeus satoi Ito, 2003
 Chydaeus schaubergeri Jedlicka, 1931
 Chydaeus semenowi (Tschitscherine, 1899)
 Chydaeus shaanxiensis Kataev, Wrase & Schmidt, 2014 – Shaanxi, China
 Chydaeus shibatai Habu, 1973 – Japan
 Chydaeus shikokuensis Habu, 1973
 Chydaeus shunichii Ito, 2006
 Chydaeus similis Kataev & Schmidt, 2001
 Chydaeus uenoi Habu, 1975
 Chydaeus weishanensis Kataev, Wrase & Schmidt, 2014 – Yunnan, China
 Chydaeus wuliangensis Kataev, Wrase & Schmidt, 2014 – Yunnan, China
 Chydaeus yunnanus Jedlicka, 1941
 Chydaeus javanicus Schauberger, 1934 – Java, Indonesia

References

Harpalinae